Styracoderus is a genus of beetles in the family Carabidae, containing the following species:

 Styracoderus atramentarius Rosenhauer, 1856
 Styracoderus azarai Perez Arcas, 1865
 Styracoderus martinezi Vuillefroy, 1868

References

Pterostichinae